Spica (stylized as SPICA) was a South Korean girl group formed in 2012 under B2M Entertainment. The group consists of Kim Boa, Park Sihyun, Park Narae, Yang Jiwon and Kim Bohyung. Their pre-debut single "Doggedly" was released on January 10, 2012, followed by their debut mini-album, Russian Roulette, on February 8, 2012. They officially disbanded on February 6, 2017, though Bohyung has confirmed a possible reunion in the future.

History

2012: Debut, Doggedly, Russian Roulette and Lonely
In the beginning of 2012, B2M Entertainment announced that they would debut a girl group. Their name is a reference to Spica, the brightest star in the constellation of Virgo. On January 10, 2012, the group released their first digital single, "Doggedly" (also translated "Potently"). The music video sparked high interest, as their fellow label-mate Lee Hyori made an appearance.

On January 31, B2M Entertainment announced that the group would have their formal debut with a mini-album, titled Russian Roulette. The full-length music video was released on February 7.  Promotions for "Russian Roulette" began two days later on M! Countdown. The lyrics of the song were later modified in order to meet MBC's broadcasting standards. The group released a repackaged extended play entitled Painkiller on March 29, promoting the title track of the same name.

Spica returned with their second EP titled Lonely on November 21, promoting the title track of the same name. They worked again with Sweetune, who also produced "Russian Roulette". The group first promoted the song on Music Bank on November 23 and held the "goodbye performance" on January 6 on Inkigayo. Other songs on the album are "With You", written by Kim Boa, "That Night", written by Kim Bohyung, and "Since You're Out of My Life". The album peaked at number 8 on Gaon's weekly album chart, selling 2,113 physical copies.

2013–2014: You Don't Love Me, US debut and Ghost

In the summer of 2013, Spica was the subject of OnStyle's TV show Lee Hyori X Unnie in which they sought and received guidance from the former Fin.K.L member, Lee Hyori.  The show was shot following Lee Hyori's promotion period for Monochrome and culminated in the band's comeback in August. On August 27, B2M Entertainment released a digital single, "Tonight", along with a music video which Lee Hyori and her husband, Lee Sangsun, collaborated and produced. Tonight's lyrics are written by Boa and Lee Hyori, and the original song was written by Dsign Music. On August 30 Spica had their comeback performance at Music Bank and made Lee Hyori cry for them.  With this single, the group was able to reach the top 10 in the Gaon Music Chart for the week of August 25–31, ranking tenth overall and eighth on the Downloads Chart with 102,297 downloads.

On January 26, 2014, Spica released "You Don't Love Me", a single musically and visually influenced by soul music of the 1960s. The song is a continuation of their relationship with the Lee Hyori and her production team, with the lyrics co-written by Kim Boa and Lee Hyori. Spica also released a song for the original soundtrack of the Korean drama A Witch's Love called "Witch's Diary."

In August, Spica partnered with Billboard to release their first English-language single. The single, "I Did It", was produced by Oliver Goldstein, Cory Enemy and Daniel Merlot. The song and its music video were released August 6, and the group made their U.S. debut performance at KCON. Ryan Book of The Music Times said the song "takes a very Beyoncé attitude, expressing themes of female empowerment with pop music".

In November 5, the entire group released the digital single "Ghost", produced by Sweetune. The music video was directed by Lee Sa-gang and featured scenes of the group during the 2014 Spring/Summer Seoul Fashion Week at Dongdaemun Design Plaza.

2015–2017: Last activities and disbandment

In 2015, member Park Sihyun and Cao Lu (former Fiestar member) collaborated on The Secret Weapon and performed Uhm Junghwa's "Invitation".

In March 2015, Spica provide the song "Because of You" for the Super Daddy Yeol OST.

In December 2015, Spica signed an exclusive contract with CJ E&M. On March 25, Spica attended KCON Abu Dhabi along with other artists. In February 2016, it was reported that Spica would release a new mini-album in April 2016, but the album was delayed.

Member Bo-hyung became one of the contestants on JTBC singing competition show Girl Spirit, that aims to highlight the main vocalists of lesser-known girl groups. The first episode premiered on July 19, 2016. She eventually won the competition.

On August 25, 2016, Spica made their first comeback after a two-years hiatus with the release of a digital single titled Secret Time. Following that, they hold their first Japanese showcase on December 4 at the same year at The Tokyo Astro Hall. The group did a cover of Utada Hikaru's "The Flavor of Life" specially for the showcase. They also performed a five-member version of Spica.S's "Give Your Love"

On February 6, 2017, CJ E&M announced that the group had disbanded, and the members would be going their separate ways.
On February 8, 2017, the group posted a letter on Instagram, confirming that they would return again in the future.

Members 
 Park Si-hyun
 Kim Bo-a
 Park Na-rae
 Yang Ji-won
 Kim Bo-hyung

Subgroup
In September 2014, B2M Entertainment formed a subgroup of Spica named Spica.S (Spica Special). The subgroup is composed of four members: Park Sihyun, Park Narae, Yang Jiwon, and Kim Bohyung. On September 11, 2014, the subgroup released their debut single, "Give Your Love" produced by Brave Brothers.

Discography

Extended plays

Singles

Soundtrack appearances

Videography

Music videos

Awards and nominations

Mnet Asian Music Awards 

|-
| 2012
| Spica
| Best New Female Artist
|

References

External links 

 
2012 establishments in South Korea
K-pop music groups
Musical groups established in 2012
Musical groups from Seoul
South Korean dance music groups
South Korean electronic musicians
South Korean girl groups
South Korean synthpop groups
Musical groups disestablished in 2017
2017 disestablishments in South Korea
B2M Entertainment artists